The Collegium of Mining and Manufacturing (also College) was a Russian executive body (collegium), created in the government reform of 1717. Its first President was Ivan Musin-Pushkin.

In 1722 the collegium was split up into two separate bodies: the Collegium of Mining and the Collegium of Manufacturing.

References 
 
 
 

Collegia of the Russian Empire
1717 establishments in Russia
1722 disestablishments in the Russian Empire